Neelangarai (literally "blue shore") is a census town and is a locality in the south of Chennai. it is situated in Chennai district in the Indian state of Tamil Nadu about seven kilometers south of Adyar, Chennai.
The former name of the city was Thiruneelakandapuram, named after the Thiruneelakandeshwarar temple. Neelankarai is located with Palavakkam in the north, Vettuvankeni in the south, Thoraipakkam in the west and the Bay of Bengal in the east. Over the years Neelankarai has developed tremendously and has made a significant name for itself in popularity for various reasons.

Demography
Neelangkarai had a population of 15,688. Males constitute 52% of the population and females 48%. Neelangkarai has an average literacy rate of 70%, higher than the national average of 59.5%: male literacy is 77%, and female literacy is 63%. In Neelangkarai, 11% of the population is under 6 years of age.

Neelangarai comes under South Chennai parliamentary constitution and Sholinganallur legislative constitution (MLA). Neelankarai is located on the East Coast Road (State Highway 49) and is parallel to Thoraipakkam on the OMR (Old Mahabalipuram Road).

Schools
 GTA Vidhya Mandir CBSE School

See also

Raja Nagar

References

Cities and towns in Kanchipuram district
Neighbourhoods in Chennai
Coastal neighbourhoods of Chennai